John Francis Pitti Hernández (born 2 August 1978) is a retired Panamanian professional football referee. He has been a full international for FIFA since 2012. He refereed some matches in the CONCACAF Champions League.

On 6 June 2021, Pitti refereed the final of the inaugural edition of the CONCACAF Nations League.

References 

1978 births
Living people
Panamanian football referees
CONCACAF Champions League referees
CONCACAF Gold Cup referees
2018 FIFA World Cup referees
Copa América referees